Stenebyen or Tjelta is a village in Sola municipality in Rogaland county, Norway.

References

Villages in Rogaland
Sola, Norway